Petra Kvitová was the two-time defending champion, but lost in the semifinals to Agnieszka Radwańska.

Radwańska went on to win the title, defeating Elina Svitolina in the final, 6–1, 7–6(7–3).

Seeds
The top two seeds received a bye into the second round.

Draw

Finals

Top half

Bottom half

Qualifying

Seeds

Qualifiers

Lucky losers

Draw

First qualifier

Second qualifier

Third qualifier

Fourth qualifier

Fifth qualifier

Sixth qualifier

External links
 WTA tournament draws

Connecticut Open - Singles
2016 Connecticut Open
2016 US Open Series